Florez or Flórez is a Spanish surname. It is a variant of the surname Flores. Notable people with the surname include: 

 Alfonso Flórez Ortiz (1952–1992), Colombian cyclist
 Ángeles Flórez Peón (born 1918), Spanish activist and writer
 Dean Florez (born 1963), California politician
 Eduardo Florez (born 1944), Mexican Olympic pentathlete
 Enrique Flórez (1702–1773), Spanish historian
 Fran Florez (fl. 1988–2010), California politician, mother of Dean Florez
 Javier Flórez (born 1982), Colombian footballer
 José Ramón Flórez (fl. 1990s–2000s), Spanish songwriter and record producer
 Juan Diego Flórez (born 1973), Peruvian operatic tenor
 Lina Flórez (born 1984), Colombian Olympic hurdler
 Luis de Florez (1889–1962), United States Navy admiral and aviator
 Manuel Antonio Flórez (c. 1722–1799), general in the Spanish navy and viceroy of New Granada
 Miguel Flórez (born 1996), Colombian cyclist
 Wenceslao Fernández Flórez (1885–1964), Spanish writer

See also
 Florez (band), American rock music group